Waleska Amaya (born 2 April 1986) is a Honduran footballer who currently plays as a midfielder.

Career
Amaya plays football for Universidad in San Pedro Sula's local women's football league.

Amaya is a member of the Honduras women's national football team.  She scored a goal in a 2015 FIFA Women's World Cup qualifying match against Belize.

References

External links 
 

1986 births
Living people
Honduran women's footballers
Women's association football midfielders
Honduras women's international footballers